Mitti is a 2001 Hindi crime-thriller film written and directed by Iqbal Durrani, produced by Salim Ahamed, and starring Ferdous Ahmed, Sharbani Mukherjee, Kulbhushan Kharbanda, Arif Zakaria, Vishal

Cast
Ferdous Ahmed 
Sharbani Mukherjee
Kulbhushan Kharbanda
Arif Zakaria
Raju Mavani
Vishal
Mukesh Tiwari

Track listing

References

External links

2000s Hindi-language films
2001 films
Indian films about revenge
Films scored by Sajid–Wajid
Films scored by Monty Sharma
Films scored by Ali-Ghani